Gold(III) bromide is a dark-red to black crystalline solid. It has the empirical formula , but exists primarily as a dimer with the molecular formula  in which two gold atoms are bridged by two bromine atoms. It is commonly referred to as gold(III) bromide, gold tribromide, and rarely but traditionally auric bromide, and sometimes as digold hexabromide. As is similar with the other gold halides, this compound is unique for being a coordination complex of a group 11 transition metal that is stable in an oxidation state of +3 whereas copper or silver complexes persist in oxidation states of +1 or +2.

History
The first mention of any research or study of the gold halides dates back to the early-to-mid-19th century, and there are three primary researchers associated with the extensive investigation of this particular area of chemistry: Thomsen, Schottländer, and Krüss.

Structure
The dimer, digold hexabromide, has structural properties similar to those of the other gold trihalide dimeric compounds, such as gold(III) chloride. The gold centers exhibit square planar coordination with bond angles of roughly 90 degrees.

Calculations indicate that in the hypothetical monomeric forms of the gold trihalides, the Jahn-Teller effect causes differences to arise in the structures of the gold halide complexes. For instance, gold(III) bromide contains one long and two short gold-bromine bonds whereas gold(III) chloride and gold(III) fluoride consist of two long and one short gold-halogen bonds. Moreover, gold tribromide does not exhibit the same coordination around the central gold atom as gold trichloride or gold trifluoride. In the latter complexes, the coordination exhibits a T-conformation, but in gold tribromide the coordination exists as more of a dynamic balance between a Y-conformation and a T-conformation. This coordination difference can be attributed to the Jahn-Teller effect but more so to the decrease in π-back bonding of the gold atoms with the bromine ligands compared to the π-back bonding found with fluorine and chlorine ligands. It is also this decrease in π-back bonding which explains why gold tribromide is less stable than its trifluoride and trichloride counterparts.

Preparation
The most common synthesis method of gold(III) bromide is heating gold and excess liquid bromine at 140 °C:

Alternatively, the halide-exchange reaction of gold(III) chloride with hydrobromic acid has also been proven successful in synthesizing gold(III) bromide:

This reaction is driven by the production of the relatively more stable hydrochloric acid compared with hydrobromic acid.

Chemical properties
The neutral monomer , as well as the other neutral gold trihalide species, has not been isolated in the gas phase which indicates the coordination number three is not favored. Predominantly, gold(III) displays square planar coordination corresponding to a preferred coordination number of four.

Specifically, in solution gold(III) trihalides have the tendency to add a fourth ligand to form the more preferred four-coordinate complex. With respect to gold tribromide, it is common to purchase gold(III) bromide hydrate, where the central gold atom exhibits a coordination number of four, rather than the anhydrous form of the compound, which exhibits a coordination number of three.

Alternatively, if there is no addition of a fourth ligand, gold tribromide will oligomerize to form the halogen-bridged dimer complex mentioned previously.

Furthermore, like gold(III) chloride, gold tribromide is a Lewis acid and can form several complexes. For example, in the presence of hydrobromic acid, the dimer dissolves and bromoauric acid is formed.

The dimer also undergoes hydrolysis rapidly in moist air.

Uses

Catalytic chemistry
Gold(III) bromide is used as a catalyst in a variety of reactions, but one of its most interesting uses is found in the Diels-Alder reaction. Specifically, the compound catalyzes the reaction between an enynal unit and carbonyl compounds to form a six-membered cyclic compound.

Another catalytic use of gold tribromide is in the nucleophilic substitution reaction of propargylic alcohols. In this reaction, the gold complex acts as an alcohol-activating agent to facilitate the substitution.

Ketamine detection

Gold(III) bromide can be used as a testing reagent for the presence of ketamine.

0.25%  0.1M NaOH is prepared to give a brownish-yellow solution. Two drops of this are added to a spotting plate and a small amount of ketamine is added. The mixture gives a deep purple color within approximately one minute, which turns to a dark, blackish-purple color within approximately two minutes.

Acetaminophen, ascorbic acid, heroin, lactose, mannitol, morphine, and sucrose all cause an instant colour change to purple, as do other compounds with phenol and hydroxyl groups.

Nothing commonly found in conjunction with ketamine gave the same colour change in the same time.

"The initial purple color may be due to the formation of a complex between the gold and the ketamine. The cause for the change of color from purple to dark blackish-purple is unknown; however, it may be due to a redox reaction that produces a small amount of colloidal gold."

References

Bromides
Metal halides
Gold(III) compounds
Drug testing reagents
Gold–halogen compounds